This is a list of the National Register of Historic Places listings in Zavala County, Texas.

This is intended to be a complete list of properties and districts listed on the National Register of Historic Places in Zavala County, Texas. There is one property listed on the National Register in the county.

Current listings

The locations of National Register properties and districts may be seen in a mapping service provided.

|}

See also

National Register of Historic Places listings in Texas
Recorded Texas Historic Landmarks in Zavala County

References

External links

Zavala County, Texas
Zavala County
Buildings and structures in Zavala County, Texas